State Route 343 (SR 343) is a short east–west state route in west-central Ohio.  The western terminus of SR 343 is at U.S. Route 68 (US 68) in Yellow Springs, and its eastern terminus is at SR 72 in Clifton.

Route description
SR 343 commences from a signalized intersection with US 68 in Yellow Springs. SR 343 generally traverses a rural backdrop through Miami Township, Greene County with a mix of woods and open fields, and the occasional house along the way. SR 343 continues east, then starts to trend southeasterly, brushing the northeastern portion of John Bryan State Park just prior to entering into Clifton. Upon crossing into Clifton, SR 343 briefly ducks into Clark County, but re-enters Greene County, as it turns easterly, following North Street through the village prior to coming to an end at a T-intersection with SR 72.

History
SR 343 came into existence in 1933 along the routing that it currently occupies.  No significant changes have taken place to SR 343 since its designation.

Major intersections

References

343
Transportation in Greene County, Ohio
Transportation in Clark County, Ohio